Heathcote is a surname rooted in English topography which literally means "Heath Cottage".  The location in Derbyshire was first recorded in the Domesday Book of 1086 as "Hedcote", and as "Hethcote" in 1244.  The location in Warwickshire appears is written "Hethcot" in the 1196 Feet of Fines for the county.  The Anglo-Saxon surname "Heathcote" originates from a hamlet that stands high on the barren hills above Dovedale and Hartington.  The place-name refers to a cottage on a heath or wasteland where was found an outlying farm or grange of Grendon Abbey.  The said Grendon Abbey was founded in 1133.  Some of the earliest references to the grange at Heathcote are found in records of the 1300s and 15th century.

Some variations of the name are Heathcoat and Heathcott. Notable people with the surname include:
Alastair Heathcote (b. 1977), British rower
Alfred Spencer Heathcote (1832–1912), English recipient of the Victoria Cross
Andy Heathcote (b. 1964), Scottish filmmaker
Bella Heathcote (b. 1987), Australian actress
Caleb Heathcote (1666–1721), Mayor of New York City, brother of Sir Gilbert Heathcote
Charles Heathcote (1850–1938), British architect
Cliff Heathcote (1898–1939), American baseball player
Dorothy Heathcote (1926–2011), British drama educator
Edwin Heathcote (b. 1968), British architect
Gilbert Heathcote (disambiguation), several people
Henry Heathcote (1777–1851), Royal Navy officer
Joe Heathcote (b. 1878), English footballer
John Heathcote (disambiguation), several people
Jud Heathcote (1927–2017), American college basketball coach
Michael Heathcote (b. 1965), English footballer
Norman Heathcote, British author, watercolourist and photographer
Paul Heathcote, British restaurateur
Richard Edensor Heathcote (1780–1850), British politician
Robert Heathcote (b. 1864), British archer
Sophie Heathcote (1972–2006), Australian actress
Thomas Heathcote (1917–1986), British actor

See also
Heathcote baronets

References